The Ministry of Foreign Affairs of the Republic of Serbia is the ministry in the government of Serbia which is in the charge of maintaining the consular affairs and foreign relations of Serbia. The current minister is Ivica Dačić, in office since 26 October 2022.

Its headquarters are located in the Ministry of Forestry and Mining and Ministry of Agriculture and Waterworks Building.

History
The foreign policy and diplomatic tradition of Serbia derive from its independent state in the twelfth, thirteenth and fourteenth centuries. Specific foreign policy and diplomatic experience of the Serbian state was drawn upon the vassal or autonomous state of the Serbian people during the various periods of the Ottoman domination in the Balkans, from the fifteenth to the nineteenth centuries.

In the nineteenth century, when the movement for independence from the Ottoman Empire became irrepressible, especially after the First Serbian Uprising (1804) under Karađorđe and the Second Uprising (1815) under Miloš Obrenović, Serbia embarked upon an ever-broader diplomatic rapport with the Porte in Constantinople, with Russia, Austria, Great Britain, France, Germany, Italy and other European nations and neighboring states, such as Romania, Bulgaria and Greece. Serbia became fully independent and internationally recognized at the Congress of Berlin in 1878.

Among the states with which Serbia established diplomatic relations first (before that time diplomatic relations were limited to certain diplomatic functions) were Russia, Austria, Great Britain, France, Germany, Italy and a number of other European countries. The diplomatic relations with the United States, however, were established only in 1882, through the ratification of the Convention on trade and navigation and the Convention on consular relations.

Following the end of World War I, in which Serbia fought on the side of the Entente, Serbia became part of the Kingdom of Yugoslavia.

In the interwar period the Kingdom was a founding member of the League of Nations and of the Little Entente with Romania and Czechoslovakia as well as of the Balkan Treaty with Romania, Greece and Turkey. The Kingdom's joining of the Axis Tripartite Pact on March 25, 1941 was revoked, by the will of the Serbian people, on the streets of Belgrade two days later.

During World War II, in which Yugoslavia was allied against the Axis Powers, a new Yugoslav federal state came into being that was proclaimed and internationally recognized in 1945.

The Socialist Federal Republic of Yugoslavia was a founding member of the United Nations in 1945 and of the Conference on Security and Co-operation in Europe in 1975. It was also one of the founders of the Non-Aligned Movement, which held two summit conferences in Belgrade, in 1961 and 1989. In the early fifties Yugoslavia was a member of the Balkan Pact with Greece and Turkey.

The ministry in current form was established on 15 January 1991.

Officials and organization
The current Minister of Foreign Affairs is Ivica Dačić. The State Secretary is Vera Mavrić and the Secretary General is Zoran Marković. Assistant Ministers are Goran Aleksić for bilateral relations, Roksanda Ninčić for multilateral affairs, Duško Lopandić for the European Union, Zoran Vujić for security policy, and Šani Dermaku for consular affairs.

Organization scheme of the ministry:

Office of the Minister
Diplomatic Protocol
Special Services
Service for Investigation and Documentation
Security Service
Service for International Legal Affairs
Translations Service
ICT Department
Secretariat General
Directorate of Personnel and Legal Affairs
Accounts and Payments Directorate
Directorate of Archival Affairs
Service for Property-Legal, General and Common Affairs
Out-of-Hours Contact Office
Inspector General
Office of the State Secretary
Directorates General
Directorate General of Bilateral Relations
Directorate for  Neighboring and South-East European Countries
Directorate for Europe
Directorate for Russia and Eurasia
Directorate for Americas
Directorate for Africa and the Middle East
Directorate for Asia, Australia and the Pacific
Directorate of Bilateral Economic Cooperation
Directorate for Borders
Directorate General of Multilateral Cooperation
Directorate for the United Nations
OSCE and CoE Directorate
Directorate of Multilateral Economic Cooperation
Directorate of Human Rights and Protection of the Environment
Directorate General for the European Union
Directorate for the Institutions of the European Union Countries
Directorate for Sectoral Affairs
Directorate for Regional Initiatives
Directorate General for NATO and Defense Affairs
Directorate for NATO
Partnership for Peace Directorate
Directorate for Weapons Control
MoD Coordination Section
Directorate General of Information and Culture
Directorate of Information
Directorate of International, Cultural, Educational, Scientific, Technological and Sports Cooperation
Directorate General of Consular Affairs and Diaspora
Directorate of Consular Affairs
Directorate of Development, Diaspora and Social Security Conventions
Councils
Council for Foreign Policy Strategy
Legal Council of the MFA
Diplomatic Academy

Serbian representation abroad
Serbia has a significant number of diplomatic missions abroad, representing its growing ties with the West along with Yugoslavia's historical ties with eastern Europe and the Non-Aligned Movement.

Serbia inherited about a third of the diplomatic facilities that belonged to the former Yugoslavia. After 2001 embassies in Chile, Colombia, the Democratic Republic of the Congo, Ghana, Guinea, Lebanon, Mongolia, North Korea, Pakistan, Thailand, Venezuela, Vietnam and Zimbabwe were closed due to financial or reciprocal reasons. In June 2008, the government of Serbia made the decision to close consulates in Bari, Graz and Malmö, and later that year Foreign Minister Vuk Jeremić announced plans to open a consulate-general in Knin, Croatia and an embassy in Kuala Lumpur, Malaysia.

On November 30, 2006, the Government of Serbia adopted the Memorandum of Agreement between the Republic of Montenegro and the Republic of Serbia on Consular Protection and Services to the Citizens of Montenegro. By this agreement, Serbian diplomatic missions provide consular services to the Montenegrin citizens on the territory of states in which Montenegro has no missions of its own.

Ministry of Foreign Affairs maintains the following missions abroad:

65 embassies;
23 consulates in 15 countries;
55 honorary consuls;
7 diplomatic missions to the: COE, EU, NATO, OSCE, UN - New York, UN - Geneva, and UNESCO.

Serbia hosts 65 foreign embassies in Belgrade, 5 Consulates-Generals (two in Niš and Subotica and one in Vršac) and 4 Liaison offices (in Priština). Serbia also hosts representatives of the Palestinian National Authority and Sovereign Military Order of Malta and 13 Honorary Consuls, some accredited as Ambassadors.

Diplomatic Academy
The first modern law on diplomatic service was passed in 1886 during the reign of King Milan. The Diplomatic Academy was formed in 1998 from the former diplomatic school of the Ministry of Foreign Affairs.

Diplomatic Archive
The diplomatic archive of the Ministry of Foreign Affairs is based on former activities of the diplomatic archive of the Kingdom of Serbia and Kingdom of Yugoslavia. It was founded on May 5, 1919 on the basis of the Decree, and it consisted of Documentation and Library of the Ministry, taken over from the Ministry of the Kingdom of Serbia and Montenegro. The Main Archive started to operate more effectively in the fall of 1924 since it was then that the Minister of Foreign Affairs formed an expert commission whose task was to inspect gathered documents on the creation of the Kingdom of Serbs, Croats and Slovenes, and make a plan of future operation of the Main archive. The Law on archives of the Ministry of Foreign Affairs and diplomatic and consular missions of the Kingdom of Yugoslavia abroad has from April 5, 1930 been precise in stating which holdings of the archive would become part of the Main Archive. The Diplomatic Archive has published the collections of public documents on foreign affairs of the SFRY between 1945 and 1950 in eight volumes called Blue edition.

List of ministers

Foreign Ministers of Serbia prior to formation of Yugoslavia
This is a list of all the Foreign Ministers (and the Acting Foreign Ministers) of the Revolutionary Serbia, the Principality of Serbia and the Kingdom of Serbia from the creation of this post in 1811 to the formation of Yugoslavia after World War I, in the late 1918. The list continues as a List of Foreign Ministers of Yugoslavia.

Foreign Ministers of Serbia since 1991
This list includes Ministers of Foreign Affairs from 1991 to 1993, and after the dissolution of the State Union of Serbia and Montenegro in 2006. For previous ministers, see Ministry of Foreign Affairs (Yugoslavia).

Political Party:

|- style="text-align:center;"
| colspan=8| Part of Ministry of Foreign Affairs of Yugoslavia

See also
 Foreign relations of Serbia
 Directorate for Cooperation with the Diaspora and Serbs in the Region
 Ministry of Foreign Affairs (Yugoslavia)

References

Further reading

External links
 

Foreign Affairs
1991 establishments in Serbia
Ministries established in 1991
Serbia
Foreign relations of Serbia